Ashi Tashi Chodzom Dorji (born 29 August 1923) is a much-loved figure in Bhutan, having played a significant role in modern history, international relations and cultural life.

Biography
Ashi Tashi Dorji, sister of the Queen Grandmother and grand-aunt to the current King, was born in Bhutan House in Kalimpong on 29 August 1923, the daughter of Gongzim Sonam Tobgye Dorji and Sikkim Princess Choying Wangmo Dorji. In 1952, she was sent by the Third King, His Majesty Jigme Dorji Wangchuck to eastern Bhutan to help the people who were being harshly taxed by local rulers, empowering her to give Kidu (land) to the Zaps and Tayps (landless classes). This became known as Ashi Tashi Thram and stopped the mass exodus of Bhutanese from the east to India. During her stay in Trashigang she met many leprosy sufferers and spent most of her evenings administering penicillin. She wrote to the king that Trashigang needed a leprosy hospital. In 1954, she recruited soldiers for the king and helped establish an army training camp.

In 1962, Tashi represented her brother Jigme Palden Dorji, the Prime Minister of Bhutan, at the 14th meeting of the Consultative Committee of the Colombo Plan, held in Melbourne, Australia. Bhutan was not one of the 17-member nations, but Australian Prime Minister Sir Robert Menzies had invited Lyonchen Jigme to attend as an observer. Just as the official delegation was preparing to make the trip, the Sino-Indian War erupted. Lyonchen Jigme couldn't leave, so he deputised his sister to lead an all-women delegation that included his wife, Tessla Dorji, and his secretary Ms Benita Dunne. Tashi Dorji attended all the events and asked that Bhutan be allowed to join. Colombo's protocol meant Bhutan should wait two years, but Tashi Dorji impressed the leaders with her speech and Bhutan was invited to join straight away. It was the first international organisation Bhutan joined.

Honours

On 11 July 2018 Ashi Tashi Dorji was the first Bhutanese national to be made an honorary Officer of the Order of Australia, in recognition of establishing strong ties between the two countries.

''Ashi Tashi Dorji’’was never awarded the Druk Thuksey Medal

Ancestry

References

1923 births
Living people
Bhutanese women in politics
Honorary Officers of the Order of Australia